Geert Chatrou is a professional whistler from the Netherlands.

Early life
Chatrou was born in Sint Odiliënberg in 1969. He started whistling at the age of four inspired by his father who used to whistle around the house.

Career
Chatrou won the International Whistler's Convention in 2004, 2005 and 2008 and was a judge at the IWC in 2010. He was also awarded male Entertainer of the year in 2006 and 2010.  He whistled the music for the movie "Le petit Nicolas". He also plays the recorder and flute.

Discography
Chatroubadour (2005) with Ocobar
Ornithology (2008)
Strange Flute (2013) with Ocobar

See also
Puccalo

Sources
Chatrou's online biography

External links
Chatrou's homepage
Chatrou whistling Queen of the Night by Mozart at YouTube

1969 births
Living people
Whistlers
Dutch musicians
People from Roerdalen